Bruno Forte (born 1 August 1949) is an Italian Roman Catholic theologian and ecclesiastic, currently Archbishop of Chieti-Vasto.

Biography
Archbishop Forte was born in Naples. He was ordained a priest on 18 April 1973. He studied at Tübingen University associated with Hans Küng, Joseph Ratzinger and Walter Kasper. He also spent time in Paris, before gaining a Laurea degree in philosophy from Naples University.

He was called "the most famous Italian theologian in Italy" and is seen as more progressive than Cardinal Joseph Ratzinger. At stake, he is considered an internationally prominent Italian theologian.

In 2000, he oversaw the preparation of the Vatican document, "Memory and Reconciliation: The Church and the Faults of the Past", which led to the famous liturgy in St Peter's Basilica in which John Paul II asked God's forgiveness for 2,000 years of sins. John Paul II asked him to preach the Vatican's Lenten Spiritual Exercises in 2004.

He was appointed as Archbishop of Chieti-Vasto by Pope John Paul II on 26 June 2004. He was consecrated bishop by Cardinal Ratzinger (later Pope Benedict XVI) on 8 September 2004; he is one of only 26 bishops consecrated by the former Pope.

After the election of Pope Benedict XVI Forte was seen by some as a possible successor to become Prefect of the Congregation for the Doctrine of the Faith, before William Levada was chosen.

After the tomb of Jesus was supposedly uncovered by James Cameron, Archbishop Forte said that "there are many such tombs in the territory of the Holy Land. Hence, there is nothing new in this revelation." He went on to say that "In fact, the thesis launched is that if Jesus is buried there with his family, then the resurrection would be no more than an invention of his disciples." He then concluded by defending the historicity of the Jesus' Resurrection saying, "However, leaving to one side the inconsistency of the archaeological proof, which has been utterly contested by Israeli archaeologists, the factual event of Jesus' resurrection is rigorously documented in the New Testament by the five accounts of the apparitions: four of the Gospels and St. Paul's."

On 5 January 2011 he was appointed among the first members of the newly created Pontifical Council for the Promotion of the New Evangelisation.

On Monday, 14 October 2013, the Archbishop was appointed by Pope Francis to serve as the Special Secretary of the Third Extraordinary General Assembly of the Synod of Bishops on "The challenges of the family in the context of evangelization", scheduled from 5–19 October 2014.

On Wednesday, 16 July 2014, Archbishop Forte was appointed by Pope Francis to serve a five-year term as a Consultant to the Congregation for Institutes of Consecrated Life and Societies of Apostolic Life (for Religious).

In October 2014, Pope Francis added him to the group responsible for summarizing the first week of discussions at the Synod on the Family. According to John L. Allen, the resulting document was "widely known to carry the imprint of Italian Archbishop Bruno Forte, one of the more noted theological minds in the Italian hierarchy".

In November 2016, Mgr Forte was elected President of the Abruzzo and Molise regional section of the Episcopal Conference of Italy. On 11 January 2021 he was succeeded by the cardinal Giuseppe Petrocchi.

Forte approved the interreligious dialogue amongst Roman Catholics and Lutherans, a relation which was put into act by the couple of leading theologians Hans Küng and Karl Barth.

References

External links

1949 births
Clergy from Naples
Living people
21st-century Italian Roman Catholic archbishops
20th-century Italian Roman Catholic theologians
Archbishops of Chieti
21st-century Italian Roman Catholic theologians
Members of the Pontifical Council for the Promotion of the New Evangelisation